Joseph Frank "Bull Montana" Poetz (June 22, 1900 – February 7, 1942) was a Major League Baseball pitcher who played in two games for the New York Giants in .

External links

1900 births
1942 deaths
Major League Baseball pitchers
Baseball players from St. Louis
New York Giants (NL) players
Henderson Gamecocks players